Deltaria brachyblastophora is a species of shrubs in the Thymelaeaceae family. It is endemic to New Caledonia and the only species of the genus Deltaria. It is related to Arnhemia, Gonystylus, Lethedon and Solmsia.

References

Endemic flora of New Caledonia
Monotypic Malvales genera
Octolepidoideae